Showcase Cinemas is a movie theater chain owned and operated by National Amusements. It operates in a total of four countries: the United States (flagship), Brazil, the United Kingdom and Argentina.

Locations 
Showcase operates more than 950 indoor screens, which are divided into smaller numbers for several locations. In each case, the company's operations for each location have a different approach.

Countries

United States 
For its flagship country, the United States, Showcase Cinemas operates a total of 22 theaters in Massachusetts (the flagship state of its United States operations), New York, Rhode Island, and Ohio under its trademark name and three other brand names: Showcase SuperLux (exclusively in Chestnut Hill, MA), Cinema de Lux and Multiplex Cinemas. Several new theaters and recently renovated theaters feature in-theater dining, plush leather seats, and more. Its facilities outside the theater include restaurants, cocktail lounges, food courts, and concession stands. All locations are handicapped accessible and offer assistance devices for the hearing and sight-impaired.

Outside the United States 

Outside the United States, Showcase Cinemas operates a total of 918 movie theaters divided among three countries: Brazil (where locations are known as "UCI Cinemas"), the United Kingdom, and Argentina.

Theater features 
Many Showcase theaters in the United States use the Starpass movie rewards program where customers earn points from purchases which can then be spent at the cinema.

In 2008 Showcase Cinemas opened their Cinema de Lux brand which provided in-theatre dining options to customers and a full bar with seat delivery service. Three of these cinemas opened in the United Kingdom and across the United States, including the Showcase SuperLux.

Many theaters offer theatre rentals for meetings, sales conferences, product launches, and private events.

References 

Cinema chains in the United Kingdom
Economy of the Northeastern United States
Movie theatre chains in the United States
Mass media companies